Raidió Teilifís Éireann Commercial Enterprises (RTÉ CEL) is the commercial arm of Ireland's public service broadcaster RTÉ or Raidió Teilifís Éireann.  RTÉ CEL is run independently from RTÉ as a whole owned subsidiary of the company, in similar way to BBC Studios, owned by RTÉ's British counterpart BBC. In 1999 it divested RTÉ of its 40% share of Cablelink. During the 1990s it had great success with Riverdance. It owns and publishes The RTÉ Guide, www.rte.ie and numerous spin off publications from RTÉ shows. It had an interest in Tara TV. 

RTÉ CEL was part of the Easy TV (DTT) consortium that bid for one of the three Commercial DTT licences offered by the BAI in 2008. RTÉ confirmed on 14 May 2010 Easy TV was "declining their offer to pursue negotiations" on the DTT contract  which ended the application process.

References

European Broadcasting Union members
Television networks in Ireland
Publicly funded broadcasters
Commercial Enterprises
State-sponsored bodies of the Republic of Ireland

ast:Raidió Teilifís Éireann
de:Raidió Teilifís Éireann
es:Raidió Teilifís Éireann
eo:Raidió Teilifís Éireann
eu:Raidió Teilifís Éireann
fr:Raidió Teilifís Éireann
ga:Raidió Teilifís Éireann
gd:Raidió Teilifís Éireann
gl:Raidió Teilifís Éireann
id:Raidió Teilifís Éireann
it:Raidió Teilifís Éireann
hu:Raidió Teilifís Éireann
nl:Raidió Teilifís Éireann
ja:アイルランド放送協会
no:Raidió Teilifís Éireann
pl:Radio Telefís Éireann
pt:Raidió Teilifís Éireann
ru:Raidió Teilifís Éireann
simple:Raidió Teilifís Éireann
fi:Raidió Teilifís Éireann
sv:Raidió Teilifís Éireann
zh:愛爾蘭電視電台